Belontia signata, the Ceylonese combtail, is a species of gourami endemic to Sri Lanka. This species inhabits shallow, slow-flowing clear-water streams. It is also found in the aquarium trade. The combtail, in addition to normal gills, has a labyrinth, or rudimentary lung-like organ which enables it to survive in poorly oxygenated water, or even out of water, for considerable periods of time. Combtails can often be observed taking air from the surface of their tank to replenish their labyrinth.

Fishkeeping
While the combtail (or combtail gourami) is sometimes found in fish shops, it does not make a good pet unless kept by itself. In a community tank it will bully other fish, and may injure or kill them. They will eat almost any food presented to them including maggots, bloodworms, flake, pellet, and vegetable foods.

References

Belontia
Freshwater fish of Sri Lanka
Fish described in 1861
Taxa named by Albert Günther
Taxonomy articles created by Polbot